The 2021 Celebration Bowl was a college football bowl game played on December 18, 2021, with kickoff at 12:00 p.m. EST at Mercedes-Benz Stadium in Atlanta, with television coverage on ABC. It was one of the highest attended and sixth edition of the Celebration Bowl, and was the only one of the 2021–22 bowl games to feature FCS teams. Sponsored by wireless service provider Cricket Wireless, the game was officially known as the Cricket Celebration Bowl.

Each year, the Celebration Bowl matches the champions of the Mid-Eastern Athletic Conference (MEAC) against the champions of the Southwestern Athletic Conference (SWAC). These are the two prominent NCAA Division I conferences of historically black colleges and universities (HBCUs).

Teams
The game was played between the South Carolina State Bulldogs, champions of the Mid-Eastern Athletic Conference (MEAC), and the Jackson State Tigers, champions of the Southwestern Athletic Conference (SWAC).

South Carolina State Bulldogs

The Bulldogs of the MEAC clinched a berth in the Celebration Bowl on November 13; they completed their regular season with a 5–0 record in conference play, 6–5 overall. This was the first Celebration Bowl appearance by the Bulldogs.

Jackson State Tigers

The SWAC was represented by the winner of the SWAC Championship Game, the Jackson State Tigers, who defeated the Prairie View A&M Panthers by a score of 27–10 on December 4.

Game summary

Statistics

References

External links
 Game statistics at statbroadcast.com

Celebration Bowl
Celebration Bowl
Jackson State Tigers football bowl games
South Carolina State Bulldogs football bowl games
Celebration Bowl
Celebration Bowl